The 63rd Tour of Flanders cycling classic was held on Sunday, 1 April 1979. The race was won by Dutch rider Jan Raas in Meerbeke after a 15 km solo attack. 34 of 180 riders finished.

Route
The race started in Sint Niklaas and finished in Meerbeke (Ninove) – covering 267 km. There were nine categorized climbs:

Results

References

External links
 Video of the 1979 Tour of Flanders on Sporza (in Dutch)

Tour of Flanders
Tour of Flanders
Tour of Flanders
Tour of Flanders
1979 Super Prestige Pernod